Lakhwinder Wadali is an Indian musician and singer, who hails from a family of musicians from Punjab, India.His grandfather Thakur Dass Wadali was a renowned vocalist and his father and uncle formed a Sufi qawwali duo, the Wadali brothers. Lakhwinder received extensive training and guidance in classical music from his father Puran Chand Wadali. His songs blend classical and current trends in music. His repertoire includes renditions of Sufi Saints, romantic, Folk numbers, ghazals, bhajans and bhangra. Alaaps and taans are the vital aspects of his music.

His albums include Unpredictable (2007), featuring Mukhtar Sahota, and Naina De Buhe.

Discography 
2021: ‘’Rabb Manneya’’ (Koi Jaane Na)
 2017: Glow Away In Tokyo (Music By: Tru-Skool) (MovieBox/Speed Records)
 2014: Ranjhanna (Wadali Music)
 2013: Ishqe Daa Jaam (Speed Records)
 2011: Naina De Buhe (Speed Records)
 2007: Unpredictable (Internalmusic)
 2004: Bulla (Music Waves)
 2002: Baba Jabbal

Filmography 
 2014: Sheesha Yaar Da (With Sarbjit Cheema)
 2010: Chhevan Dariya
 2009: Akhiyan Udeekdiyan

References

External links
 Lakhwinder Wadali, Official Website
 

Indian male classical musicians
Living people
Year of birth missing (living people)
Sufi music
Ghazal singers
Bhangra (music) musicians
Bhajan singers